The Reformed Churches in Spain is a confessional Calvinist denomination in Spain.

The group currently has seven congregations spread across the kingdom: churches in Mataró and Pineda, both near Barcelona; in Madrid; in Almuñécar and Málaga in southern Spain; and in La Laguna, Tenerife and Telde (Gran Canaria) both in the Canary Islands. 

The churches adhere to the Three Forms of Unity, and some of them recognise the Westminster Confession of Faith. The Malaga congregation allows paedocommunion, while all of the congregations practice infant baptism. 

The denomination maintains good ecclesiastical contact with the Evangelical Presbyterian Church in England and Wales, the Free Church of Scotland, and the Reformed Churches in the Netherlands (Liberated). It is also a member of the International Conference of Reformed Churches.

See also 
 Protestantism in Spain
 Anglicanism in Spain
 Evangelical Presbyterian Church in Spain
 Federation of Evangelical Religious Entities of Spain
 Spanish Evangelical Church
 Spanish Evangelical Lutheran Church
 Union of Evangelical Baptists of Spain

References

External links 
Reformed Church in Madrid

Protestantism in Spain
Reformed denominations in Europe